James Herman may refer to:
James G. Herman, American oncologist
James P. Herman, American neuroscientist
Jim Herman (born 1977), American golfer

See also